United States v. Moore, 486 F.2d 1139 (D.C. Cir. 1973), was a case decided by the D.C. Circuit that refused to recognize a common law affirmative defense of addiction in a criminal prosecution for the possession of heroin.

Decision
The defendant Moore was charged with the possession of heroin, and in his defense sought to introduce psychiatric testimony that because of his heroin addiction he lacked substantial capacity to conform his behavior to the standards of the criminal law.  The court refused to recognize Moore's proposed common law defense of addiction because of difficulties in administration and inconsistency with the Model Penal Code.

A dissenting opinion by Judge J. Skelly Wright advocated for the recognition of the common law defense.

References

1973 in United States case law
United States Court of Appeals for the District of Columbia Circuit cases
United States controlled substances case law
United States federal criminal case law
Heroin